The Riverfront Transit Center is a multi-modal transportation center currently used as a local bus and commuter bus hub for TANK and SORTA, in the city of Cincinnati, Ohio near Great American Ballpark and The Banks project. It runs alongside the Fort Washington Way freeway trench. The center was completed in 2003 and has the capacity to handle up to 500 buses and 20,000 people per hour during sporting or other special events.

Bus services
The center serves as a hub for the SORTA during sporting events and other special events.

Future rail connections
The center is also expected to serve as the central hub for the planned Eastern Corridor Commuter Rail connecting Cincinnati to Milford.

Criticism
The center has been criticised due to the fact that it is largely unused. Proponents point out delays in the streetcar lightrail and commuter rail plans as well as delays in construction of The Banks a multi-use commercial and residential project.

See also
 Cincinnati Subway, a set of incomplete, derelict tunnels and stations for a rapid transit system beneath the streets of Cincinnati, Ohio.

References

External links
 Go Metro, SORTA official website

Bus transportation in Cincinnati
Rail transportation in Cincinnati
Transportation buildings and structures in Cincinnati
2003 establishments in Ohio
Transport infrastructure completed in 2003